Seán Kelly (born 12 April 1997) is a Gaelic footballer who plays as a defender for Moycullen and the Galway county team. He captained Galway in the 2022 All-Ireland Senior Football Championship Final.

Playing career

Club
Kelly scored an extra-time goal for Moycullen against Strokestown in the 2022 Connacht Senior Club Football Championship semi-final to send his team through to the final against Tourlestrane.

College
Kelly played on the NUI Galway team that lost the 2018 Sigerson Cup final. He was still on the NUI Galway team when the university won the 2022 Sigerson Cup, the only player to have featured in both games.

Inter-county
Kelly played for Galway in the 2017 All-Ireland Under-21 Football Championship final loss to Dublin.

Kevin Walsh introduced him to the senior county team in 2018. After Walsh's successor Pádraic Joyce took over as manager, Kelly was injured in the first half of the 2021 Connacht Senior Football Championship final defeat to Mayo and was a loss for his team. Joyce appointed Kelly as captain of the Galway team for 2022, with Matthew Tierney as vice-captain.

In the 2022 All-Ireland quarter-final between Armagh and Galway at Croke Park, he — along with Armagh joint captain Aidan Nugent — was controversially shown a straight red card following a brawl before extra-time. Television cameras could not detect any involvement by Kelly in the violence, apart from annoyance and efforts to point out that Armagh's Tiernan Kelly had attempted to gouge the eyes of Kelly's teammate Damien Comer. Kelly was later described as a "sacrificial lamb". Kelly would have missed the semi-final against Derry had referee David Coldrick's decision stood. But it was set to be overturned in the absence of any wrongdoing on Kelly's part. Colm O'Rourke later wrote in the Sunday Independent: "Seán Kelly acted with incredible restraint during the fracas at the end of normal time, but was put on death row for next weekend's All-Ireland semi-final. He did not deserve that and his gesture in immediately shaking hands with Aidan Nugent after both were sent off by David Coldrick said a lot about the man." O'Rourke wrote elsewhere in the same publication: "If anything, Kelly was the closest thing to Mother Teresa, as he looked more a peacemaker than a combatant and showed remarkable restraint in not flattening Tiernan Kelly [who had just gouged the eyes of Damien Comer]".

Personal life
Kelly's father, Padraig "Dandy" Kelly, was a substitute for Galway in the 1983 All-Ireland Senior Football Championship Final defeat to Dublin. He died in 2001 at the age of 40.

Honours
Moycullen
 Galway Senior Football Championship (2): 2020, 2022

Galway
 Connacht Senior Football Championship (2): 2018, 2022

NUI Galway
 Sigerson Cup: 2022

References

Living people
Gaelic football backs
Galway inter-county Gaelic footballers
Moycullen Gaelic footballers
University of Galway Gaelic footballers
1997 births